The Plummer model or Plummer sphere is a density law that was first used by H. C. Plummer to fit observations of globular clusters. It is now often used as toy model in N-body simulations of stellar systems.

Description of the model 

The Plummer 3-dimensional density profile is given by

 

where  is the total mass of the cluster, and a is the Plummer radius, a scale parameter that sets the size of the cluster core. The corresponding potential is

 

where G is Newton's gravitational constant. The velocity dispersion is

 

The distribution function is 

 

if , and  otherwise, where  is the specific energy.

Properties 

The mass enclosed within radius  is given by 
 

Many other properties of the Plummer model are described in Herwig Dejonghe's comprehensive article.

Half-mass radius is 

The 2D surface density is:

,

and hence the 2D projected mass profile is:

.

In astronomy, it is convenient to define 2D half-mass radius which is the radius where the 2D projected mass profile is half of the total mass: .

For the Plummer profile: .

The escape velocity at any point is

For bound orbits, the radial turning points of the orbit is characterized by specific energy  and specific angular momentum  are given by the positive roots of the cubic equation

where , so that . This equation has three real roots for : two positive and one negative, given that , where  is the specific angular momentum for a circular orbit for the same energy. Here  can be calculated from single real root of the discriminant of the cubic equation, which is itself another cubic equation

Applications 
The Plummer model comes closest to representing the observed density profiles of star clusters, although the rapid falloff of the density at large radii is not a good description of these systems.

The behavior of the density near the center does not match observations of elliptical galaxies, which typically exhibit a diverging central density.

The ease with which the Plummer sphere can be realized as a Monte-Carlo model has made it a favorite choice of N-body experimenters, in spite of the model's lack of realism.

References

Astrophysics